The gho or g'ô is the traditional and national dress for men in Bhutan. Introduced in the 17th century by Ngawang Namgyal, 1st Zhabdrung Rinpoche, to give the Ngalop people a more distinctive identity, it is a knee-length robe tied at the waist by a cloth belt known as the kera. On festive occasions, it is worn with a kabney.

The government of Bhutan requires all men to wear the gho if they work in a government office or school. Men are also required to wear the gho on formal occasions. In its modern form, the law dates from 1989, but the driglam namzha dress code is much older.

The traditional dress for men is the gho, a knee-length robe tied with a handwoven belt, known as kera. Under the gho, men wear a tego, a white jacket with long, folded-back cuffs.

See also
Kira
Toego
Kabney
Kho (costume)

References

Bhutanese clothing